Marian Kamil Dziewanowski (27 June 1913, Zhytomyr – 18 February 2005, Milwaukee, Wisconsin) was a historian of Poland, Russia and modern Europe.

Life
Born in Zhytomir, Russian Empire (now Ukraine), Dziewanowski was the son of Kamil and Zofia (Kamieńska) Dziewanowski. He grew up and studied in interwar Poland at the Jagiellonian University in Kraków.  In 1937–39 he was a foreign correspondent in Berlin, covering the Anschluss with Austria, the Munich Conference, and the German occupation of the Sudetenland.

During the German invasion of Poland, Dziewanowski served as a Polish cavalry platoon leader.  Later he served in England as an instructor/interpreter at a school for paratroopers and saboteurs, as an editor of a secret radio station working with the resistance in Poland, as a BBC News commentator, and, in Washington, as an aide to the Polish military attache.  While in Britain, he married Ada Karczewska in 1946. After the war, he chose to remain in exile rather than return to communist Poland.

He moved to the United States, where at Harvard University he earned one of the first postwar doctorates in Russian and East European history. The topic of his dissertation was "Genealogy of a Party: Origins and Beginnings of the Communist Party of Poland," and it was supervised by Michael Karpovich. It was later revised and published by Harvard University Press as Communist Party of Poland: An Outline History (1959; 2nd ed., 1976). Dziewanowski taught at Boston College from 1954 to 1965, and then at Boston University from 1965 to 1979, where he attained the rank of professor. From 1979 to 1984 he taught at the University of Wisconsin–Milwaukee.

Dziewanowski authored the most popular articles and books on 19th- and 20th-century Polish and Russian history. He wrote important works on the political ideas of Józef Piłsudski, the most prominent Polish politician of the interbellum, and of the great 19th-century Polish and Russian politician, Prince Adam Jerzy Czartoryski.

He was a member of the Polish Academy of Learning, headquartered in Kraków.

Works
Russia in the Twentieth Century
Poland in the Twentieth Century
 A History of Soviet Russia and Its Aftermath
War At Any Price: World War II In Europe, 1939-1945
Communist Party of Poland: An Outline History
Alexander I: Russia's Mysterious Tsar
The Revolution of 1904-1905 and the Marxist Movement of Poland
Pilsudski's Federal Policy, 1919-1921
Joseph Pilsudski: A European Federalist, 1918-1922
Czartoryski and His Essai sur la diplomatie'See also
 List of Poles

References

 Donald Pienkos, Marian Kamil Dziewanowski is Remembered
  Marian Kamil Dziewanowski (1913-2005)
 M.K. Dziewanowski, War at Any Price'', 2nd ed., 1991, preface, p. xi.

1913 births
2005 deaths
Writers from Zhytomyr
People from Zhitomirsky Uyezd
People from the Russian Empire of Polish descent
20th-century American historians
American male non-fiction writers
20th-century Polish historians
Polish male non-fiction writers
Polish emigrants to the United States
Harvard Graduate School of Arts and Sciences alumni
Boston University faculty
University of Wisconsin–Milwaukee faculty
Diplomats of the Second Polish Republic
Polish military personnel of World War II
20th-century American male writers
People associated with the magazine "Kultura"